NS7, NS-7, NS.7, NS 7, or, variation, may refer to:

Places
 Kranji MRT station (station code: NS7), Sungei Kadut, Singapore
 Hirano Station (Hyōgo), station code: NS07; Kawanishi, Hyōgo Prefecture, Japan
 Haraichi Station (station code: NS07), Ageo, Saitama, Japan
 Chester-St. Margaret's (constituency N.S. 07), Nova Scotia, Canada

Transportation
 Blue Origin NS-7, a 2017 December 17 Blue Origin suborbital spaceflight mission for the New Shepard
 RAF N.S. 7, a British NS class airship
 Škoda Kodiaq (model NS7), midsized crossover SUV

Other uses
 Netscape 7, webbrowser
 BRAF (gene), aka "NS7"
 New Penguin Shakespeare volume 7

See also

 NS (disambiguation)
 7 (disambiguation)

Disambiguation pages